Robbie Davies Jr. (born 3 October 1989) is a British professional boxer. He has held the British, Commonwealth, and European light-welterweight titles between 2018 and 2019.

Professional career
Davies made his professional debut on 7 June 2013 at the Liverpool Olympia, forcing Carl Allen to retire from the bout in the first round. His second professional fight also ended in a first round victory after the referee stopped the bout, Davies having downed his opponent, Josh Thorne, three times.

In early 2016 it was announced that Davies would face Jarkko Putkonen for the vacant WBA Continental light-welterweight title, at the Devonshire House Hotel in Liverpool, on 5 March 2016. Davies won the title after stopping Putkonen in the sixth round with a right to the body. After two successful defences of the title, first against Xavier Luques Castillo, and then against Zoltan Szabo, Davies lost the title in his first professional loss against Michal Syrowatka on 15 July 2017, at the Wembley Arena, Davies knocked out in the twelfth round. Davies regained the title in a rematch against Syrowatka on 31 March 2018 at the ACC in Liverpool, the referee ending the bout in the twelfth round after Syrowatka had been downed three times.

On 13 October 2018, Davies faced Glenn Foot for the Commonwealth and vacant British light-welterweight titles, at the Metro Radio Arena in Newcastle. Davies beat Glenn on points despite suffering a cut above his left eye in the third round.

On 30 March 2019, Davies won the European light-welterweight title after defeating Joe Hughes on points, at the Echo Arena in Liverpool.

Professional boxing record

References

External links

Light-welterweight boxers
British Boxing Board of Control champions
English male boxers
European Boxing Union champions
Commonwealth Boxing Council champions
1989 births
Living people